Beta Scorpii (β Scorpii, abbreviated Beta Sco, β Sco) is a multiple star system in the southern zodiac constellation of Scorpius. It bore the traditional proper name of Acrab , though the International Astronomical Union now regards that name as applying only to the β Scorpii Aa component.

Components
Observed through a small telescope, Beta Scorpii appears as a binary star with a separation between the two components of 13.5 arcseconds and a combined apparent magnitude of 2.50. This pair, designated β¹ Scorpii and β² Scorpii, form the top branches of a hierarchy of six orbiting components.
Hierarchy of orbits in the β Scorpii system
β¹ Scorpii, the brighter of the pair, consists of two sub-components, designated β Scorpii A and β Scorpii B, orbiting at an angular separation of 0.3 arcseconds with an orbital period of 610 years. β Scorpii A is itself a spectroscopic binary, with the two components designated β Scorpii Aa (also named Acrab) and β Scorpii Ab. They are separated by 1.42 milliarcseconds and have an orbital period of 6.82 days.

β² Scorpii also has two sub-components, designated β Scorpii C and β Scorpii E, orbiting at an angular separation of 0.1328 arcseconds with an orbital period of 39 years. β Scorpii E in turn is a spectroscopic binary with components designated β Scorpii Ea and β Scorpii Eb and having an orbital period of 10.7 days.

Component β Scorpii D is the unrelated seventh magnitude star HD 144273, 520" away. Some authors have also referred to component Ab as D.

A companion to component B, β Scorpii G, has been proposed to account for missing mass in the system, but no further evidence of its existence has been found. β Scorpii F refers to a theorised companion to component E.

Nomenclature

β Scorpii (Latinised to Beta Scorpii) is the star's Bayer designation; β¹ and β² Scorpii, those of its two components. The designations of the sub-components - β Scorpii A, Aa, Ab, B, C, E, Ea and Eb - derive from the convention used by the Washington Multiplicity Catalog (WMC) for multiple star systems, and adopted by the International Astronomical Union (IAU).

Beta Scorpii bore the traditional names Acrab, Akrab or Elacrab, all deriving from the Arabic name al-'Aqrab 'the Scorpion' for the whole constellation, as well as Graffias , Italian for "the claws", a name it shared with Xi Scorpii. 

In 2016, the International Astronomical Union organized a Working Group on Star Names (WGSN) to catalogue and standardize proper names for stars. The WGSN decided to attribute proper names to individual stars rather than entire multiple systems. It approved the name Acrab for the component β Scorpii Aa on 21 August 2016 and it is now so included in the List of IAU-approved Star Names.

Namesake
USS Graffias (AF-29) was once a United States navy ship named after the star.

Properties

The β Scorpii system is a kinematic member of the Upper Scorpius subgroup of the Scorpius–Centaurus association, a group of thousands of young stars with mean age 11 million years at distance 470 light years (145 parsecs). Analysis of β1 Scorpii as a single star derived an evolutionary age between 9 and 12 million years, but analysis of the β Scorpii system as a whole suggest an age closer to 6 million years.

The two components of β Scorpii A are the most massive members of the system,  and  respectively. The combined spectral type is B1 V. The individual spectral types cannot be clearly measured, but are estimated to be B0.5 and B1.5. Component Aa is evolving slightly away from the zero age main sequence and its luminosity class is estimated to be intermediate between subgiant (IV) and main sequence (V).

Component B is over 20 times fainter than the combined component A stars and a clear spectral type has not been measured.

It is chemically peculiar, with high abundances of manganese and strontium. It is possibly a mercury-manganese (HgMn) star, but abundances of other metals are unexpectedly low.

Beta Scorpii is 1.01 degree from the ecliptic and can be occulted by the Moon and, very rarely, by planets. On December 9, 1906, it was occulted by Venus. The last occultation by a planet took place on 13 May 1971, by Jupiter.

In culture
Beta Scorpii appears on the flag of Brazil, symbolising the state of Maranhão.

References

External links
Beta Scorpii by Jim Kaler

Scorpii, Beta
Spectroscopic binaries
6
B-type main-sequence stars
Scorpius (constellation)
Acrab
Upper Scorpius
Scorpii, 08
5984 5
144217 8
078820 1
Durchmusterung objects
Mercury-manganese stars